The Seventh Avenue station (also Seventh Avenue–Park Slope station) is an express station on the IND Culver Line of the New York City Subway, located at Seventh Avenue and Ninth Street in the Park Slope neighborhood of Brooklyn. It is served by the F and G trains at all times, and by the <F> train during rush hours in the peak direction.

The Seventh Avenue station was constructed by the Independent Subway System (IND). It opened on October 7, 1933, as part of an extension of the Culver Line, which was known as the Smith Street Line or the South Brooklyn Line at the time. Though the Seventh Avenue station contains four tracks and two island platforms, as with most express stations in the New York City Subway express stations, the inner tracks see limited use, being used only by peak-direction <F> trains.

History 
One of the goals of Mayor John Hylan's Independent Subway System (IND), proposed in the 1920s, was a line to Coney Island, reached by a recapture of the BMT Culver Line. As originally designed, service to and from Manhattan would have been exclusively provided by Culver express trains, while all local service would have fed into the IND Crosstown Line. The line was extended from Bergen Street to Church Avenue on October 7, 1933, including the Seventh Avenue station.

The station received a $400,000 renovation starting in 2015. In January 2016, it was proposed to relocate the station booth to the 7th Avenue entrance (where 65% of entrances and exits occur). Most of the mezzanine would also be closed off, and the turnstiles would be replaced. Waist-high turnstiles at the 7th and 8th Avenue ends were installed in August 2016, replacing the HEETS. Much of the mezzanine closed permanently on January 23, 2018, at which time the station booth was relocated. A 2015 proposal to add elevators at the station was rejected because it would have cost $15 million. However, in 2019, the MTA announced that this station would become ADA-accessible as part of the agency's 2020–2024 Capital Program. A contract for three elevators at the station was awarded in December 2020.

Service changes 
The station was originally served by the A train. In 1936, the A was rerouted to the IND Fulton Street Line and was replaced by E trains from the Queens Boulevard Line. Following the completion of the Culver Ramp in 1954,  Concourse Express trains replaced F service to Coney Island. In November 1967, the Chrystie Street Connection opened and D trains were rerouted via the Manhattan Bridge and the BMT Brighton Line to Coney Island. F trains were extended once again via the Culver Line.

The center tracks at the station were used for F express service starting in June 1968, while G trains were extended from Smith–Ninth Streets to Church Avenue to provide local service. Express service between Bergen and Church ended in 1976 due to budgetary concerns and passenger complaints, and the GG, later renamed the G, was again terminated at the Smith–Ninth Streets station.

In July 2009, the G was extended from its long-time terminus at Smith–Ninth Streets to a more efficient terminus at Church Avenue to accommodate the rehabilitation of the Culver Viaduct. The G extension was made permanent in July 2012. In July 2019, the MTA revealed plans to restore express service on the Culver Line between Jay Street and Church Avenue. Express service started on September 16, 2019.

Station layout 

This station has two island platforms and four tracks. South of this station, the express tracks separate from the local tracks and rejoin beneath them north of Fort Hamilton Parkway, then rise up again. The tile band is mustard yellow with a sienna brown border, set in a three-high "express station" course. The top border is slightly wider than the bottom and bisects the center of the band at regular intervals. This appears to be a modern aberration done during a renovation sometime in the 1980s as historical images show standard IND style color bands before 1972. There is evidence of water damage on both trackside walls.

While this station is underground and Fourth Avenue is on an elevated trestle, this station is actually at a higher elevation than Fourth Avenue. This is because Brooklyn's topography slopes downwards towards the west (hence the neighborhood name of Park Slope), allowing the line to enter into the hillside between the two stations.

The station contains a full-length mezzanine with exits at 7th Avenue and 8th Avenue. The full-time fare control area and station booth was located in the middle of the mezzanine, between 7th Avenue at 8th Avenue. Waist-high turnstiles led to single staircases to either platform. Unstaffed entrances were located at the either end of the station, allowing customers to exit the station without having to walk to the middle area. Full-height High Entry-Exit Turnstiles (HEETs) were formerly present at these locations. There was a passageway within fare control from the platform stairs at 7th Avenue to a HEET turnstile leading to the station booth. There are four staircases to each platform, two at the 7th Avenue end and two at the 8th Avenue end. One staircase from each platform formerly led to the mezzanine, but has been closed off. Crossovers between service directions are available at all staircases.

Exits

There are eight street stairs – four going up to all four corners of 9th Street and 7th Avenue, and four going up to all four corners of 9th Street and 8th Avenue. The 8th Avenue entrance also has an intermediate level at the first staircase, otherwise a descending hill.

Inside the fare control near the Eighth Avenue entrance is a large scale painting of Prospect Park's The Raven.

References

External links 

 
 Station Reporter — F Train
 Station Reporter — G Train
 The Subway Nut — 7th Avenue Pictures
 Seventh Avenue entrance from Google Maps Street View
 Eighth Avenue entrance from Google Maps Street View
 Platforms from Google Maps Street View

1933 establishments in New York City
IND Culver Line stations
New York City Subway stations in Brooklyn
Park Slope
Railway stations in the United States opened in 1933